Tuxford is a town in Nottinghamshire, England.

Tuxford may also refer to:

 Tuxford, Saskatchewan, community in Canada
 George Tuxford (1870–1942), Canadian brigadier of the First World War
 George Parker Tuxford (ca.1810–1870), English magazine publisher
 William Wedd Tuxford (1826–1878), South Australian industrialist and parliamentarian